The Sai Kung District Council is the district council for the Sai Kung District in Hong Kong. It is one of 18 such councils. The Sai Kung District Council currently consists of 31 members, of which the district is divided into 29 constituencies, electing a total of 29 with two ex-officio members who are the Hang Hau and Sai Kung rural committee chairmen. The latest election was held on 24 November 2019.

History
The Sai Kung District Council was established on 1 April 1981 under the name of the Sai Kung District Board as the result of the colonial Governor Murray MacLehose's District Administration Scheme reform. The District Board was partly elected with the ex-officio Regional Council members and chairmen of two Rural Committees, Hang Hau and Sai Kung, as well as members appointed by the Governor until 1994 when last Governor Chris Patten refrained from appointing any member.

The Sai Kung District Board became Sai Kung Provisional District Board after the Hong Kong Special Administrative Region (HKSAR) was established in 1997 with the appointment system being reintroduced by Chief Executive Tung Chee-hwa. The current Sai Kung District Council was established on 1 January 2000 after the first District Council election in 1999. The appointed seats were abolished in 2015 after the modified constitutional reform proposal was passed by the Legislative Council in 2010.

The Sai Kung District Council is one of the fastest growing councils due to the rapid development of Tseung Kwan O new town in the late 1990s and early 2000s. Traditionally dominated by the rural forces, different political parties also established its presence in the urban area in the 1990s. The pro-Beijing Democratic Alliance for the Betterment of Hong Kong (DAB) doubled their seats from four to eight after absorbed the Hong Kong Progressive Alliance (HKPA) in 2005 and became the largest party in the council. The pro-Beijing Civil Force which has been in alliance with the New People's Party also has substantial presence in the district. The pro-democracy camp in the district was represented by the Democratic Party, until it lost half of its seats after the reformist faction led by Gary Fan quit the party and formed the Neo Democrats in 2010 over the disagreement on the constitutional reform proposal.

In the 2019 election, the pro-democrats scored a landslide victory by taking 26 of the 29 seats in the council, with Neo Democrats becoming the largest party and Concern Group for Tseung Kwan O People's Livelihood (CGPLTKO) the second largest grouping. The pro-Beijing camp was almost completely wiped out from the council, except for the two ex-officio Rural Committee chairmen and three moderate councillors led by Christine Fong.

Political control
Since 1982 political control of the council has been held by the following parties:

Political makeup

Elections are held every four years.

District result maps

Members represented
Starting from 1 January 2020:

Leadership

Chairs
Since 1985, the chairman is elected by all the members of the board:

Vice Chairs

Notes

References

 
Districts of Hong Kong
Sai Kung District